Punctulum is a genus of minute sea snails, marine gastropod mollusks or micromollusks in the family Rissoidae.

Species
Species within the genus Punctulum include:

 Punctulum delicatum Golikov & Sirenko, 1998
 Punctulum flavum (Okutani, 1964)
 Punctulum minutum Golikov & Fedjakov, 1987
 Punctulum porcupinae (Gofas & Warén, 1982)
 Punctulum reticulatum Golikov, 1986
 Punctulum wyvillethomsoni (Friele, 1877)
Species brought into synonymy
 Punctulum ochotense Golikov & Sirenko, 1998: synonym of  Punctulum flavum (Okutani, 1964)

References

Rissoidae